Meare is a village and civil parish  north west of Glastonbury on the Somerset Levels, in the Mendip district of Somerset, England. The parish includes the village of Westhay.

History

Meare is a marshland village in typical Somerset "rhyne" country, standing on the site of pre-historic lake dwellings. The site of the Meare Lake Village is marked by groups of mounds. It has been occupied for thousands of years and some of the archaeological finds are now being reported.

A 14th-century fish house at Meare was once the abode of Glastonbury Abbey fishermen, who fished the, now drained, Meare Pool. The Manor Farmhouse was built at the same time as the summer residence of the Abbots from Glastonbury Abbey and is now a farmhouse. Along with its outbuildings the farmhouse has been designated as a Grade I listed building.

The parish was part of the hundred of Glaston Twelve Hides.

Governance

The parish council has responsibility for local issues, including setting an annual precept (local rate) to cover the council's operating costs and producing annual accounts for public scrutiny. The parish council evaluates local planning applications and works with the local police, district council officers, and neighbourhood watch groups on matters of crime, security, and traffic. The parish council's role also includes initiating projects for the maintenance and repair of parish facilities, as well as consulting with the district council on the maintenance, repair, and improvement of highways, drainage, footpaths, public transport, and street cleaning. Conservation matters (including trees and listed buildings) and environmental issues are also the responsibility of the council.

The village falls within the Non-metropolitan district of Mendip, which was formed on 1 April 1974 under the Local Government Act 1972, having previously been part of Wells Rural District, which is responsible for local planning and building control, local roads, council housing, environmental health, markets and fairs, refuse collection and recycling, cemeteries and crematoria, leisure services, parks, and tourism.

Somerset County Council is responsible for running the largest and most expensive local services such as education, social services, libraries, main roads, public transport, policing and fire services, trading standards, waste disposal and strategic planning.

It is also part of the Wells county constituency represented in the House of Commons of the Parliament of the United Kingdom. It elects one Member of Parliament (MP) by the first past the post system of election.

Religious sites

The parish Church of St Mary was formerly in the keeping of Glastonbury Abbey, and dates from 1323. It was built for Abbot Adam of Sodbury, and is a Grade I listed building.

References

External links

 Meare parish community website

Villages in Mendip District
Somerset Levels
Civil parishes in Somerset